Hexagon House is a historic home in Winchester, Virginia built between 1871 and 1873 and is a two-story, hexagon floor-plan, brick dwelling, with semi-hexagonal ground-floor projections and an ornate three-bay veranda-style porch on the principal façade.  It has a central chimney and is topped by dark red, low-pitched roofs extending to substantial white cornicing.

Completed in 1873 by architect Brice Leatherman for James W. Burgess in a style designed to open up interior space and let in more natural light. Even rarer than octagon houses built on similar principles.

It was added to the National Register of Historic Places in 1987.

See also
 National Register of Historic Places listings in Winchester, Virginia

References

External links
 

Houses on the National Register of Historic Places in Virginia
Houses completed in 1873
Houses in Winchester, Virginia
National Register of Historic Places in Winchester, Virginia